Shibganj Upazila may refer to:

Shibganj Upazila, Bogra
Shibganj Upazila, Nawabganj